Nguyễn Vũ Tín (born 10 February 1998) is a Vietnamese association footballer who plays for V.League 1 club Hồ Chí Minh City.

References

Living people
Vietnamese footballers
Association football forwards
V.League 1 players
Saigon FC players
1998 births